Chinocossus greeni is a moth in the family Cossidae. It was described by G.S. Arora in 1976. It is found in Sri Lanka.

References

Cossinae
Moths described in 1976
Moths of Asia